A coronal mass ejection (CME) is a significant ejection of magnetic field and accompanying plasma mass from the Sun's corona into the heliosphere. CMEs are often associated with solar flares and other forms of solar activity, but a broadly accepted theoretical understanding of these relationships has not been established.

If a CME enters interplanetary space, it is referred to as an interplanetary coronal mass ejection (ICME). ICMEs are capable of reaching and colliding with Earth's magnetosphere, where they can cause geomagnetic storms, aurorae, and in rare cases damage to electrical power grids. The largest recorded geomagnetic perturbation, resulting presumably from a CME, was the solar storm of 1859. Also known as the Carrington Event, it disabled parts of the at the time newly created United States telegraph network, starting fires and shocking some telegraph operators.

Near solar maxima, the Sun produces about three CMEs every day, whereas near solar minima, there is about one CME every five days.

Physical properties

CMEs release large quantities of matter and magnetic flux from the Sun's atmosphere into the solar wind and interplanetary space. The ejected matter is a plasma consisting primarily of electrons and protons embedded within the ejected magnetic field. This magnetic field is commonly in the form of a flux rope, a helical magnetic field with changing pitch angles.

CMEs can typically be observed in white-light coronagraphs via Thomson scattering of sunlight off of free electrons within the CME plasma. A typical CME may have any or all of three distinctive features: a dense core, a surrounding cavity of low electron density, and a bright leading edge. The dense core is usually interpreted as a prominence embedded in the CME (see ) with the leading edge as an area of compressed plasma ahead of the CME flux rope. However, some CMEs exhibit more complex geometry.

Most ejections originate from active regions on the Sun's surface, such as groupings of sunspots associated with frequent flares. These regions have closed magnetic field lines, in which the magnetic field strength is large enough to contain the plasma. These field lines must be broken or weakened for the ejection to escape from the Sun. However, CMEs may also be initiated in quiet surface regions, although in many cases the quiet region was recently active. During solar minimum, CMEs form primarily in the coronal streamer belt near the solar magnetic equator. During solar maximum, they originate from active regions whose latitudinal distribution is more homogeneous.

These speeds correspond to transit times from the Sun out to Earth's orbit of about 13 hours to 86 days, with about 3.5 days as the average.

However, the estimated mass values for CMEs are only lower limits, because coronagraph measurements provide only two-dimensional data. The frequency of ejections depends on the phase of the solar cycle: from about 0.2 per day near the solar minimum to 3.5 per day near the solar maximum. These values are also lower limits because ejections propagating away from Earth (backside CMEs) usually cannot be detected by coronagraphs.

Current knowledge of CME kinematics indicates that the ejection starts with an initial pre-acceleration phase characterized by a slow rising motion, followed by a period of rapid acceleration away from the Sun until a near-constant velocity is reached. Some balloon CMEs, usually the slowest ones, lack this three-stage evolution, instead accelerating slowly and continuously throughout their flight. Even for CMEs with a well-defined acceleration stage, the pre-acceleration stage is often absent, or perhaps unobservable.

Magnetic cloud
In the solar wind, CMEs manifest as magnetic clouds. They have been defined as regions of enhanced magnetic field strength, smooth rotation of the magnetic field vector, and low proton temperature. The association between CMEs and magnetic clouds was made by Burlaga et al. in 1982 when a magnetic cloud was observed by Helios-1 two days after being observed by SMM. However, because observations near Earth are usually done by a single spacecraft, many CMEs are not seen as being associated with magnetic clouds. The typical structure observed for a fast CME by a satellite such as ACE is a fast-mode shock wave followed by a dense (and hot) sheath of plasma (the downstream region of the shock) and a magnetic cloud.

Other signatures of magnetic clouds are now used in addition to the one described above: among other, bidirectional superthermal electrons, unusual charge state or abundance of iron, helium, carbon, and/or oxygen.

Interplanetary coronal mass ejections

ICMEs typically reach Earth one to five days after leaving the Sun. During their propagation, ICMEs interact with the solar wind and the interplanetary magnetic field (IMF). As a consequence, slow ICMEs are accelerated toward the speed of the solar wind and fast ICMEs are decelerated toward the speed of the solar wind. The strongest deceleration or acceleration occurs close to the Sun, but it can continue even beyond Earth orbit (1 AU), which was observed using measurements at Mars and by the Ulysses spacecraft. ICMEs faster than about  eventually drive a shock wave. This happens when the speed of the ICME in the frame of reference moving with the solar wind is faster than the local fast magnetosonic speed. Such shocks have been observed directly by coronagraphs in the corona, and are related to type II radio bursts. They are also closely linked with the acceleration of solar energetic particles.

Cause

The exact cause of CMEs is not currently known; however, it is generally thought that CMEs are caused by the destabilization of large-scale magnetic structures in the corona and the resulting reconfiguration of the coronal magnetic field.

The phenomenon of magnetic reconnection is closely associated with many models of both CMEs and solar flares. In magnetized plasmas, magnetic reconnection is the sudden rearrangement of magnetic field lines when two oppositely directed magnetic fields are brought together. Reconnection releases magnetic energy stored in the original stressed magnetic fields. These magnetic field lines can become twisted in a helical structure, with a right-hand twist or a left-hand twist. As the Sun's magnetic field lines become more and more twisted, CMEs appear to be a release of the magnetic energy being built up, as evidenced by the helical structure of CMEs. Otherwise the twists would renew themselves continuously each solar cycle and eventually rip the Sun apart.

On the Sun, magnetic reconnection may happen on solar arcades—a series of closely occurring loops of magnetic lines of force. These lines of force quickly reconnect into a low arcade of loops, leaving a helix of magnetic field unconnected to the rest of the arcade. The sudden release of energy during this process causes the solar flare and ejects the CME. The helical magnetic field and the material that it contains may violently expand outwards forming a CME. This also explains why CMEs and solar flares typically erupt from what are known as the active regions on the Sun where magnetic fields are much stronger on average.

Impact on Earth

Only a very small fraction of CMEs are directed toward, and reach, the Earth. A CME arriving at Earth results in a shock wave causing a geomagnetic storm that may disrupt Earth's magnetosphere, compressing it on the day side and extending the night-side magnetic tail. When the magnetosphere reconnects on the nightside, it releases power on the order of terawatts directed back toward Earth's upper atmosphere. This can result in events such as the March 1989 geomagnetic storm.

CMEs, along with solar flares, can disrupt radio transmissions and cause damage to satellites and electrical transmission line facilities, resulting in potentially massive and long-lasting power outages.

Shocks in the upper corona driven by CMEs can also accelerate solar energetic particles toward the Earth resulting in gradual solar particle events. Interactions between these energetic particles and the Earth can cause an increase in the number of free electrons in the ionosphere, especially in the high-latitude polar regions, enhancing radio wave absorption, especially within the D-region of the ionosphere, leading to polar cap absorption events.

The interaction of CMEs with the Earth's magnetosphere leads to dramatic changes in the outer radiation belt, with either a decrease or an increase of relativistic particle fluxes by orders of magnitude. The changes in radiation belt particle fluxes are caused by acceleration, scattering and radial diffusion of relativistic electrons, due to the interactions with various plasma waves.

Halo coronal mass ejections
A halo coronal mass ejection is a CME which appears in white-light coronagraph observations as an expanding ring completely surrounding the occulting disk of the coronagraph. Halo CMEs are interpreted as CMEs directed toward or away from the observing coronagraph. When the expanding ring does not completely surround the occulting disk, but has an angular width of more than 120 degrees around the disk, the CME is referred to as a partial halo coronal mass ejection. Partial and full halo CMEs have been found to make up about 10% of all CMEs with about 4% of all CMEs being full halo CMEs. Frontside, or Earth-direct, halo CMEs are often associated with Earth-impacting CMEs; however, not all frontside halo CMEs impact Earth.

Future risk
According to a report published in 2012 by physicist Pete Riley of Predictive Science Inc., the chance of Earth being hit by a Carrington-class storm between 2012 and 2022 was 12%.

In 2019, researchers used an alternative method (Weibull distribution) and estimated the chance of Earth being hit by a Carrington-class storm in the next decade to be between 0.46% and 1.88%.

Associated phenomena

CMEs can be associated with other forms of solar activity:
Solar particle events
Solar flares
Eruptive prominences
X-ray sigmoids
Coronal dimming (long-term brightness decrease on the solar surface)
Moreton waves and EUV waves
Post-eruptive arcades
Solar radio emissions
The association of CMEs with some of those phenomena is common but not fully understood. For example, CMEs and flares are normally closely related, but there has been confusion about this point caused by events originating beyond the limb. For such events no flare could be detected. Most weak flares do not have associated CMEs; most powerful ones do. Some CMEs occur without any flare-like manifestation, but these are often weaker and slower. It is now thought that CMEs and associated flares are caused by a common event (the CME peak acceleration and the flare impulsive phase generally coincide). In general, all of these events (including the CME) are thought to be the result of a large-scale restructuring of the magnetic field; the presence or absence of a CME during one of these restructures would reflect the coronal environment of the process (i.e., can the eruption be confined by overlying magnetic structure, or will it simply break through and enter the solar wind).

Eruptive prominences

Eruptive prominences are associated with at least 70% of all CMEs. Prominences are often embedded within the bases of flux ropes making up CMEs. The eruptive prominence corresponds with the bright core seen in white-light coronagraphs.

Coronal dimming
A coronal dimming is an observed decrease in extreme ultraviolet and soft X-ray emissions in the corona during the onset of some CMEs. Coronal dimmings are thought to occur predominantly due to a decrease in plasma density caused by mass outflows during the expansion of the associated CME. They often occur either in pairs located within regions of opposite magnetic polarity, a core dimming, or in a more widespread area, a secondary dimming. Core dimmings are interpreted as the footpoint locations of the erupting flux rope; secondary dimmings are interpreted as the result of the expansion of the overall CME structure and are generally more diffuse and shallow.

Coronal dimming was first reported in 1974. Due to their appearance resembling that of coronal holes, they were sometimes referred to as transient coronal holes.

Solar radio bursts

The shock wave located at the leading edge of some CMEs can produce Type II radio bursts when the shock wave accelerates electrons. Some Type IV radio bursts are also associated with CMEs and have been observed to follow Type II bursts.

History

First traces
The largest recorded geomagnetic perturbation, resulting presumably from a CME, coincided with the first-observed solar flare on 1 September 1859. The resulting solar storm of 1859 is referred to as the Carrington Event. The flare and the associated sunspots were visible to the naked eye, and the flare was independently observed by English astronomers R. C. Carrington and R. Hodgson. At around the same time as the flare, a magnetometer at Kew Gardens recorded what would become known as a magnetic crochet, a magnetic field detected by ground-based magnetometers induced by a perturbation of Earth's ionosphere by ionizing soft X-rays. This could not easily be understood at the time because it predated the discovery of X-rays in 1895 and the recognition of the ionosphere in 1902.

About 18 hours after the flare, further geomagnetic perturbations were recorded by multiple magnetometers as a part of a geomagnetic storm. The storm took down parts of the recently created US telegraph network, starting fires and shocking some telegraph operators.

Historical records were collected and new observations recorded in annual summaries by the Astronomical Society of the Pacific between 1953 and 1960.

First optical observations
The first optical observation of a CME was made on 14 December 1971 using the coronagraph of Orbiting Solar Observatory 7 (OSO-7). It was first described by R. Tousey of the Naval Research Laboratory in a research paper published in 1973. The discovery image (256 × 256 pixels) was collected on a Secondary Electron Conduction (SEC) vidicon tube, transferred to the instrument computer after being digitized to 7 bits. Then it was compressed using a simple run-length encoding scheme and sent down to the ground at 200 bit/s. A full, uncompressed image would take 44 minutes to send down to the ground. The telemetry was sent to ground support equipment (GSE) which built up the image onto Polaroid print. David Roberts, an electronics technician working for NRL who had been responsible for the testing of the SEC-vidicon camera, was in charge of day-to-day operations. He thought that his camera had failed because certain areas of the image were much brighter than normal. But on the next image the bright area had moved away from the Sun and he immediately recognized this as being unusual and took it to his supervisor, Dr. Guenter Brueckner, and then to the solar physics branch head, Dr. Tousey. Earlier observations of coronal transients or even phenomena observed visually during solar eclipses are now understood as essentially the same thing.

Instruments
On 1 November 1994, NASA launched the Wind spacecraft as a solar wind monitor to orbit Earth's  Lagrange point as the interplanetary component of the Global Geospace Science (GGS) Program within the International Solar Terrestrial Physics (ISTP) program. The spacecraft is a spin axis-stabilized satellite that carries eight instruments measuring solar wind particles from thermal to greater than MeV energies, electromagnetic radiation from DC to 13 MHz radio waves, and gamma-rays.

On 25 October 2006, NASA launched STEREO, two near-identical spacecraft which, from widely separated points in their orbits, are able to produce the first stereoscopic images of CMEs and other solar activity measurements. The spacecraft orbit the Sun at distances similar to that of Earth, with one slightly ahead of Earth and the other trailing. Their separation gradually increased so that after four years they were almost diametrically opposite each other in orbit.

Notable coronal mass ejections

On 9 March 1989, a CME occurred, which struck Earth four days later on 13 March. It caused power failures in Quebec, Canada and short-wave radio interference.

On 23 July 2012, a massive, and potentially damaging, solar superstorm (solar flare, CME, solar EMP) occurred but missed Earth, an event that many scientists consider to be Carrington-class event.

ESA's Venus Express gathered data. The CME reached Mars on 17 October and was observed by the Mars Express, MAVEN, Mars Odyssey, and Mars Science Laboratory missions. The New Horizons spacecraft was at  approaching Pluto when the CME passed three months after the initial eruption, and it may be detectable in the data. Voyager 2 has data that can be interpreted as the passing of the CME, 17 months after. The Curiosity rover's RAD instrument, Mars Odyssey, Rosetta and Cassini showed a sudden decrease in galactic cosmic rays (Forbush decrease) as the CME's protective bubble passed by.

Stellar coronal mass ejections
There have been a small number of CMEs observed on other stars, all of which  have been found on red dwarfs. These have been detected mainly by spectroscopy, most often by studying Balmer lines: the material ejected toward the observer causes asymmetry in the blue wing of the line profiles due to Doppler shift. This enhancement can be seen in absorption when it occurs on the stellar disc (the material is cooler than its surrounding), and in emission when it is outside the disc. The observed projected velocities of CMEs range from ≈. There are few stellar CME candidates in shorter wavelengths in UV or X-ray data.     Compared to activity on the Sun, CME activity on other stars seems to be far less common. The low number of stellar CME detections can be caused by lower intrinsic CME rates compared to the models (e.g. due to magnetic suppression), projection effects, or overestimated Balmer signatures because of the unknown plasma parameters of the stellar CMEs.

See also
Forbush decrease
Health threat from cosmic rays
K-index
List of solar storms
Orbiting Solar Observatory
Solar and Heliospheric Observatory
Space weather

References

Further reading

Books

Internet articles

External links

 NOAA/NWS Space Weather Prediction Center
 Coronal Mass Ejection FAQ
 STEREO and SOHO observed CME rate versus the Sunspot number (PNG plot) / (text version)

Solar phenomena
Stellar phenomena
Articles containing video clips